The Tima are an ethnic group of the Nuba Mountains in South Kordofan state, in southern Sudan. They number several thousands.

Language
The Tima people speak Tima, which is in the  Kordofanian languages group (of the Nuba Mountains), in the major Niger-Congo language family.

See also
Heiban Nuba people
Talodi people

References
Joshua Project

Ethnic groups in Sudan
South Kordofan
Nuba peoples